Cuiheng is a village of the town of Nanlang, Zhongshan, Guangdong province. Cuiheng is best known as the birthplace of Dr. Sun Yat-sen, the "Father of the Nation" of the Republic of China. The whole village is designated a special economic district, as Cuiheng New Area.

History
The village was established in the latter half of the 17th century during the reign of Kangxi Emperor by the Feng and Mai families, who were later joined by the Yang and Lu (陸) families. The Lu surname became most numerous.  At the time of Sun Yat-sen's birth in the 1860s, there were about sixty households with ten surnames.  In addition to Sun, Lu Muzhen, Sun's first wife and Lu Haodong (1868–1895), an early revolutionary martyr, were also born in Cuiheng.

Administration
Cuiheng is administrated by Nanlang Township. For a time, Cuiheng village was elevated to the township level and became the town of Cuiheng Village. However, in 1998 it was downgraded and reintegrated inside the town of Nanlang. On 31 March 2013 Cuiheng was upgraded into a "New Area".

Tourism
Cuiheng is home to the Former Residence of Dr Sun Yat-sen and the Sun Yat-sen Residence Memorial Museum, which was built next to the residence in 1956. The residence and museum complex was classified as a Major Site Protected at the National Level of China in 1986 by the State Council of China. There is also a Polaris Temple dedicated to the Polaris Emperor.

Transportation
Cuiheng can be accessed by Zhongshan Bus 12 and 212. The village is a 30–40 minutes by bus from Zhongshan city centre on Bus 12, and 50-minutes from the Zhongshan Passenger Ferry Dock on Bus 212. The township of Nanlang, about 10 minutes to the north by bus on both routes, has a station on the Guangzhou–Zhuhai Intercity Railway.

References 

Zhongshan
Villages in China
Sun Yat-sen